The 2019 Torneig Internacional Els Gorchs was a professional tennis tournament played on outdoor hard courts. It was the ninth edition of the tournament which was part of the 2019 ITF Women's World Tennis Tour. It took place in Les Franqueses del Vallès, Spain between 29 April and 5 May 2019.

Singles main-draw entrants

Seeds

 1 Rankings are as of 22 April 2019.

Other entrants
The following players received wildcards into the singles main draw:
  Paula Badosa Gibert
  Marina Bassols Ribera
  Irene Burillo Escorihuela
  Marta Custic

The following player received entry using a protected ranking:
  Océane Dodin

The following players received entry from the qualifying draw:
  Susan Bandecchi
  Lou Brouleau
  Gabriela Dabrowski
  María Gutiérrez Carrasco
  Ivana Popovic
  Ioana Loredana Roșca
  Eden Silva
  Lucie Wargnier

Champions

Singles

 Katy Dunne def.  Paula Badosa Gibert, 7–5, 6–3

Doubles

 Jessika Ponchet /  Eden Silva def.  Jodie Anna Burrage /  Olivia Nicholls, 6–3, 6–4

References

External links
 2019 Torneig Internacional Els Gorchs at ITFtennis.com
 Official website

2019 ITF Women's World Tennis Tour
2019 in Spanish sport